The first USS Sioux (YT-19) was an iron-hulled tug in the United States Navy. Sioux was named after the Sioux people.

Sioux, was built as P. H. Wise at Philadelphia in 1892 by Neafie & Levy and was purchased by the U.S. Navy on 25 March 1898.

Spanish–American War assignment 
Acquired for the impending war with Spain, the tug was assigned to the Atlantic station and operated at the Norfolk Navy Yard. In 1901, she moved north for duty at the Portsmouth Navy Yard in Kittery, Maine; and, in 1907, she was transferred to the Boston Navy Yard. On 18 January 1908 she went ashore on Gull Rocks, Newport, Rhode Island. Refloated and returned to service.

Decommissioning 
She was renamed Nyack on 20 February 1918, and she was sold at Boston on 18 July 1921 to William S. Nolan.

References

External links
 
 Naval Historical Center: Online Library of Selected Images: USS Sioux (1898–1921), later Nyack (YT-19)
 ZC (Ship) Files in the Navy Department Library

Tugs of the United States Navy
Ships built by Neafie and Levy
1892 ships